Franklin Township is one of the fifteen townships of Adams County, Ohio, United States.  As of the 2010 census, the population was 1,110.

Geography
Located in the northeastern corner of the county, it borders the following townships:
Mifflin Township, Pike County - north
Sunfish Township, Pike County - northeast
Rarden Township, Scioto County - east
Meigs Township - south
Bratton Township - west
Brushcreek Township, Highland County - northwest corner

No municipalities are located in Franklin Township.

History
Franklin Township was organized in 1828. It is named for Benjamin Franklin.

It is one of twenty-one Franklin Townships statewide.

Government
The township is governed by a three-member board of trustees, who are elected in November of odd-numbered years to a four-year term beginning on the following January 1. Two are elected in the year after the presidential election and one is elected in the year before it. There is also an elected township fiscal officer, who serves a four-year term beginning on April 1 of the year after the election, which is held in November of the year before the presidential election. Vacancies in the fiscal officership or on the board of trustees are filled by the remaining trustees.

References

External links
County website

Townships in Adams County, Ohio
1828 establishments in Ohio
Populated places established in 1828
Townships in Ohio